Navicella is a genus of fungi in the family Massariaceae. "Navicella" is Italian for "small ship", and also found in English in reference to a mosaic by Giotto in St Peter's, Rome, now so often restored as to be effectively lost.  In the 19th century the genus of molluscs now called Septaria were known as "Navicella".

References

External links
Index Fungorum

Pleosporales